The Uruguayan ambassador in Tel Aviv is the official representative of the Government in Montevideo to the Government of the Israel.

List of representatives

References 

 
Israel
Uruguay